Hardscrabble Hill is a summit located in Central New York Region of New York located in the Town of Marshall in Oneida County, northeast of Waterville.

References

Mountains of Oneida County, New York
Mountains of New York (state)